Dr. Henry Skelton House is a historic house at 889 South Main Street in Southington, Connecticut.  Built about 1748, it is a well-preserved example of colonial Georgian architecture.  It was listed on the National Register of Historic Places in 1989.

Description and history
The Dr. Henry Skelton House is located south of the village center of Southington, at the northeast corner of South Main Street and Buckland Street.  It is a -story wood-frame structure, with a side-gable roof, central brick chimney, and clapboarded exterior.  Its main facade is five bays wide, with windows placed with slight asymmetry around a center entrance.  The entrance has a period board door with strap hinges; it and the first floor windows (which are unusually tall for the period) are topped by a wooden stringcourse that serves as a lintel.  A leanto section (apparently integral to the main body construction) extends to the rear, giving the house a saltbox profile.  The side gable peak sections are finished in decorative Queen Anne style cut wooden shingles.

The house was built about 1748 for Southington's second doctor, Henry Skelton, who was born in England in 1688.  The tall windows on the first floor are probably a later Greek Revival modification, and the building at one time sported a full-width Italianate porch.

See also
National Register of Historic Places listings in Southington, Connecticut

References

Houses on the National Register of Historic Places in Connecticut
Colonial architecture in the United States
Houses completed in 1748
Houses in Southington, Connecticut
National Register of Historic Places in Hartford County, Connecticut
1748 establishments in Connecticut